Youth Island, Isle of Youth or Island of Youth may refer to:

 Insel der Jugend ("Youth Island"), an islet on the Spree river in Alt-Treptow, Berlin, Germany.
 Isla de la Juventud ("Island of Youth"), the second largest island in Cuba, and the largest of the 350 islands in the Canarreos Archipelago (Archipiélago de los Canarreos).
 Otok hrvatske mladeži ("Island of the Croatian Youth"), or "Youth Island", an island in lake Juran, Zagreb, Croatia, home of the annual InMusic Festival
 Tír na nÓg ("Land of the Young"), an island in Irish mythology.
 Ungdomsøen ("The Youth Island"), a youth camp on Middelgrund island, Copenhagen.